Brigitte Gapais-Dumont (25 April 1944 – 29 November 2018) was a French fencer. She won a silver medal in the women's team foil event at the 1976 Summer Olympics.

References

External links
 

1944 births
2018 deaths
Sportspeople from Yonne
French female foil fencers
Olympic fencers of France
Fencers at the 1964 Summer Olympics
Fencers at the 1968 Summer Olympics
Fencers at the 1972 Summer Olympics
Fencers at the 1976 Summer Olympics
Olympic silver medalists for France
Olympic medalists in fencing
Medalists at the 1976 Summer Olympics
Universiade medalists in fencing
Universiade gold medalists for France
20th-century French women